Revelation is the debut mixtape primarily conducted by Tom Aspaul. It was self-released as one continuous YouTube video on 19 May 2015. It was the follow-on project from Aspaul's debut single "Indiana", which was produced by rising popstar MNEK, and features works from GRADES, Starsmith and Giraffage.

Track listing

Sample credits
 "Pioneer FM" contains samples of "Runaway" performed by Janet Jackson and "Why" performed by Carly Simon.
 "New Moon" is a cover of "Full Moon" performed by Brandy and contains samples of "Why" performed by Carly Simon.
 "I Luh Ya" contains samples of the I Luh Ya Papi performed by Jennifer Lopez.
 "Ripui'" contains samples of "Ripui" performed by Yma Sumac.

References

External links
Revelation Mixtape on soundcloud.com

2015 EPs
Tom Aspaul albums